is a 1967 Japanese crime suspense film directed by Kazuo Mori. Screenplay by Yasuzo Masumura and Yoshihiro Ishimatsu. It stars Raizō Ichikawa. The film was adapted from the novel Zenya written by Keishi Nagi. Sequel of the film Aru Koroshiya no Kage was released in the same year.

Plot
Source:
Shoizawa is working as a chef at a small restaurant but it is a cover for who he really is. He is an assassin who takes charge of killing people with money. One day, he is asked to murder Owada, the boss of the yakuza clan, for 20 million yen.

Cast
Source:
 Raizō Ichikawa as Shiozawa
 Yumiko Nogawa as Keiko
 Mikio Narita as Maeda
 Mayumi Nagisa as Shigeko
 Asao Koike as Kimura
 Saburo Date as Joe
 Sachiko Kobayashi as Midori
 Chikara Hashimoto as Guard
 Tatsuo Matsushita as Owada

References

External links
A Certain Killer at Kadokawa

1967 films
1960s Japanese-language films
Films based on Japanese novels
Daiei Film films
Japanese crime films
1960s Japanese films